This is a list of official overseas visits and Commonwealth tours made by the Duke and Duchess of Sussex. Prince Harry, as a child, first traveled with his parents on official visits and tours. He later became one of the United Kingdom's most important ambassadors; sometimes the Duke traveled overseas as a representative of the UK. His wife, Meghan, began undertaking official trips upon joining the British royal family in 2018. The Duke and Duchess also toured Commonwealth realms, of which his father is the king, as her representative or as members of the realm's royal family. The Duke and Duchess ceased undertaking engagements in the UK and overseas after stepping down as working members of the royal family in 2020.

List of official overseas visits

See also
List of state visits made by Elizabeth II
List of Commonwealth visits made by Elizabeth II
List of official overseas trips made by Charles III
List of official overseas trips made by William, Prince of Wales, and Catherine, Princess of Wales

References

Foreign relations of the United Kingdom
Harry, Duke of Sussex
Overseas trips
Harry, Duke of Sussex
Harry, Duke of Sussex
State visits by British leaders